The Douglas O-38 was an observation airplane used by the United States Army Air Corps.

Between 1931 and 1934, Douglas built 156 O-38s for the Air Corps, eight of which were O-38Fs. Some were still in service at the time of the Pearl Harbor Attack in 1941.

The O-38 is a modernized derivative of the O-25, itself a re-engined variant of the earlier Douglas O-2.

Variants

O-38 derivative of the Curtiss Conqueror-engined O-25 but with a 525-hp (391-kW) Pratt & Whitney R-1690-3 radial engine and Townend ring cowling; the National Guard received all 44 production aircraft
O-38A single unarmed O-38 staff liaison machine for the National Guard

O-38B derivative of the O-38 with an R-1690-5 engine; total production was 63, comprising 30 for USAAC observation squadrons and 33 for the National Guard
O-38C single aircraft similar to the O-38B for use by US Coast Guard
O-38E model with a wider and deeper fuselage on the lines of the private-venture O-38S, with a sliding canopy over the cockpits and a 625-hp (466-kW) R-1690-13 radial engine driving a metal propeller; could be operated on twin Edo floats; the National Guard took delivery of 37 such aircraft
O-38F eight unarmed staff liaison aircraft delivered to the National Guard in 1933 with an R-1690-9 engine and a revised, fully enclosed canopy
O-38P Almost identical to the E/F series. Six aircraft delivered to Perú in February 1933, fitted with Edo floats; Three took part in the conflict against Colombia, and took part in air combats against Colombian Curtiss Hawk IIs, one being lost as consequence of damage received during those clashes. Survivors were converted to wheels, and served as trainers until 1940.
O-38S private-venture development of the O-38 with a wider and deeper fuselage, crew canopy and a smooth-cowled  Wright R-1820-E Cyclone radial engine; in effect was the prototype of the O-38E
A-6 proposed use of the O-38 as a radio-controlled target drone (cancelled)

Operators

Colombian Air Force - One captured from Peru in 1933 and returned to Peru in 1934.

Haiti Air Corps - Six delivered in June 1942. Retired in 1948.

Peruvian Navy

United States Army Air Corps

Surviving aircraft
The sole surviving example of an O-38 is on display at the National Museum of the United States Air Force at Wright-Patterson AFB near Dayton, Ohio. For several decades it was believed that no examples of this aircraft survived, until the wreckage of an O-38F was located in Alaska in the late 1960s. This aircraft was the first airplane to land at Ladd Field near Fairbanks, Alaska, in October 1940. Both crewmen survived the landing unhurt, and hiked to safety after supplies were dropped to them, but the aircraft's location was considered too remote for it to be salvaged. The wreckage was eventually rediscovered nearly thirty years later during an aerial survey of the area, and the plane's type was soon identified. The staff of the Air Force Museum recognized it as the last surviving example, and quickly assembled a team to examine the aircraft for possible retrieval and restoration. Upon arriving at the crash site they found the aircraft surprisingly well preserved, with only the two seats and the tailwheel curiously missing. The team was even able to light their campfires using the aircraft's remaining fuel. Plans were soon made to remove the aircraft by a CH-47 Chinook helicopter from Fort Greeley on 10 June 1968, and it was transported back to Dayton, Ohio. Meanwhile, the missing seats were found in the shack of a local frontiersman where they were being used as chairs. The missing tailwheel was taken because he thought he might build a wheelbarrow someday. The restoration by the museum's staff took several years, and many structural pieces of the wings had to be reverse engineered from original plans and damaged parts. The finished aircraft with its original engine was completed and placed on display in 1974. It is currently displayed hanging in the museum's Interwar Years Gallery.

Specifications (O-38B)

References

Further reading

External links

1930s United States military utility aircraft
Biplanes
Single-engined tractor aircraft